Inge Janssen (born 20 April 1989) is a Dutch rower. A world champion in the women's four, she was part of the Dutch quadruple sculls that won silver at the 2016 Olympics and competed in the double sculls at the 2012 Summer Olympics.

She is a 2010 graduate from the University of Virginia.

Career
At the 2011 World Under 23 Championship, she won bronze with Ellen Hogerwerf.

At the 2013 European Championships, Janssen won bronze in the women's single sculls, while at the 2014 European Championships, she won the bronze in the women's double sculls with Nicole Beukers.

Between 2014 and 2015, Janssen switched to the quadruple sculls.

In 2015, Janssen, Chantal Achterberg, Nicole Beukers and Carline Bouw won bronze at the World Championships and silver at the European Championships.

At the 2016 Olympics, Janssen, Chantal Achterberg, Nicole Beukers and Carline Bouw won silver in the women's quadruple sculls.

She won the women's quadruple sculls at the 2017 World Championship with Olivia van Rooijen, Sophie Souwer and Nicole Beukers.  That year, the team also won European silver.

References

External links

1989 births
Living people
Dutch female rowers
Rowers at the 2012 Summer Olympics
Rowers at the 2016 Summer Olympics
Rowers at the 2020 Summer Olympics
Olympic rowers of the Netherlands
Sportspeople from Voorburg
World Rowing Championships medalists for the Netherlands
Olympic silver medalists for the Netherlands
Olympic medalists in rowing
Medalists at the 2016 Summer Olympics
University of Virginia alumni
20th-century Dutch women
21st-century Dutch women